Butterley railway station is a preserved railway station on the Heritage Midland Railway - Butterley in Derbyshire.

History

Originally located on the Midland Railway's Ambergate to Pye Bridge Line, the station opened on 1 May 1875 as Butterley, being renamed Butterley for Ripley and Swanwick on 29 July 1935. It closed to passengers on 16 June 1947, but remained open for goods traffic until 7 November 1964. The line itself closed in 1968. British Railways demolished the original station buildings and signal box.

Stationmasters

James Blackwell 1875 - 1884
W. Allen 1884 - 1885
J. Randall 1885 - 1886
John H. Grundy 1886 - 1906 (afterwards station master at Alfreton)
William Tunn 1906 - 1908 (afterwards station master at Pinxton)
Amos Follows 1908 - 1910 (afterwards station master at Kirkby-in-Ashfield)
Samuel Joseph Whitehead 1910 - 1922 (afterwards station master at Bulwell)
Edward Skerrett ca. 1924
Fred Fletcher 1927 - 1936 (afterwards station master at Cannock Chase)
Mr. Billington ca. 1940
H. Anslow ca. 1955 ca. 1956

Midland Railway Trust

The station was reopened by the Midland Railway Trust on 22 August 1981 Volunteers have restored the station site, rebuilding the station buildings from Whitwell railway station (in addition, there are some Portakabins). The signal box comes from Ais Gill, on the famous Settle-Carlisle Line and is a standard Midland type 2B box. The station originally had two platforms but the present only the southernmost platform (i.e. the original westbound line) is in use to the public.

Swanwick Junction railway station is a short walk or train ride away to the east.  Hammersmith railway station is a shorter distance to the west over Butterley Reservoir by train.

There is parking available at this station.

See also
Listed buildings in Ripley, Derbyshire

References

Sources 

 
 

Heritage railway stations in Derbyshire
Railway stations in Great Britain opened in 1875
Railway stations in Great Britain closed in 1947
Former Midland Railway stations